The Kem is a river in Republic of Karelia, Russia. It starts from Lake Lower Kuyto and flows through a number of lakes into the White Sea. There is a cascade of 5 hydroelectric power plants. The town of Kem is located in the mouth of the Kem. Tributaries: Chirka-Kem, Okhta, Kepa, Shomba.

See also
Kem (Yenisei)

References

Rivers of the Republic of Karelia